The 1962 Richmond Spiders football team was an American football team that represented the University of Richmond as a member of the Southern Conference (SoCon) during the 1962 NCAA University Division football season. In their twelfth  season under head coach Ed Merrick, Richmond compiled a 6–3 record, with a mark of 3–2 in conference play, finishing in third place in the SoCon.

Schedule

References

Richmond
Richmond Spiders football seasons
Richmond Spiders football